The following active airports serve the area around Prince Rupert, British Columbia, Canada:

See also

 List of airports in the Gulf Islands
 List of airports in the Lower Mainland
 List of airports in the Okanagan
 List of airports on Vancouver Island
 List of airports in Greater Victoria

References

 Prince Rupert
Airports
Prince Rupert, British Columbia
Lists of buildings and structures in British Columbia
Prince Rupert, British Columbia